Dobrogoszcz may refer to the following places in Poland:
Dobrogoszcz, Lower Silesian Voivodeship (south-west Poland)
Dobrogoszcz, Wałcz County in West Pomeranian Voivodeship (north-west Poland)
Dobrogoszcz, Podlaskie Voivodeship (north-east Poland)
Dobrogoszcz, Pomeranian Voivodeship (north Poland)
Dobrogoszcz, Szczecinek County in West Pomeranian Voivodeship (north-west Poland)